National Secondary Route 232, or just Route 232 (or ) is a National Road Route of Costa Rica, located in the Cartago province.

Description
In Cartago province the route covers Turrialba canton (La Suiza, Pavones districts).

References

Highways in Costa Rica